The Football Queensland Premier League 3 - Metro is the first tier of senior soccer in Brisbane, Queensland (fourth tier in Queensland and fifth overall in Australia). It is run and administered by Football Queensland Metro. Formerly known as the Brisbane Premier League the competition was renamed in 2022 with Football Queensland's takeover of the league structure from Football Brisbane. Twelve teams play a twenty-two match regular season, with the team at the top of the table designated as 'Premiers', and the top four teams qualifying for a finals series.

The league premiers earn automatic promotion to the Queensland Premier League 2 (the third-tier league in Queensland from season 2020 onwards), while the second place team participates in a playoff series with the other south east Queensland conference premiers for the second promotion spot. The bottom two teams in the FQPL3 at the end of the season are relegated to the next tier in Brisbane, FQPL4.

Current clubs 
The teams for Season 2023 are shown in alphabetical order in the table below.

Honours

 1 Challenge Cup held as a knockout competition (see section on Charity Cup competition).
 2 Ipswich and West Moreton Association competition continued during these seasons.
 3 Competition restricted to Second and Third Divisions and Junior competitions.

References :

Media

The league and its lower divisions are covered by several local newspapers throughout the city, suburbs and surrounding areas including Ipswich and Toowoomba. Highlights of matches, often at least 2 matches per round, in the league are put together by FB Media (the Media arm of Football Brisbane). Live scores and updates from all Brisbane Premier League matches can be found on The Washing Line Facebook page. The Washing Line website also publishes reports, previews and newspaper articles from around the city. The website built upon the Unofficial site YourBPL.com which began media coverage of the league in 2007. From 2012, the newly founded 'FB Media' has been producing weekly podcasts which can be downloaded from The Washing Line website featuring prominent guests including James Meyer, Miron Bleiberg, Matt Mundy and a wide variety of coaches and players from the Brisbane Premier League.
Some games are covered by PaulyTV and FBTV.

Media milestones

 On Sunday 23 May 2010, a match between Brisbane Wolves and Pine Rivers United became the first BPL match to be streamed live on the internet. Wolves won 5–2.
 On Saturday 11 June 2011, a match between Redlands United and Olympic FC featured on The Danny Baker Show in the UK, on BBC Radio 5 Live. Olympic won 3–2.
 At the end of the 2011 season following the success of Wolves FC, 18 goal centreback Patrick Hopkins was scouted via FBTV match highlights for Ljungskile SK in Sweden. In need of a forward, the league's top scorer Steffen Vroom soon followed.

Sponsors

From 2014 to 2015 the Brisbane Premier League was known as the Trophy Superstore Premier League.

This changed in 2016 when Flight Centre became the league sponsors, thus known as the Flight Centre Premier League.

See also
 Football Queensland Metro
 Football Queensland Premier League 2
 Football Queensland Premier League 3 − Darling Downs
 Football Queensland Premier League 3 − South Coast
 Football Queensland Premier League 3 − Sunshine Coast
 Football Queensland Premier League 4 − Metro

References

Football Queensland
Soccer leagues in Queensland
Sports leagues established in 1983
1983 establishments in Australia
Fifth level football leagues in Asia